The vanguard is the leading part of an advancing military formation.

Vanguard may also refer to:

Military

China 
 Chengdu J-10 "Vanguard", a 4.5-generation Chinese fighter plane
 QW-1 Vanguard, an advanced Chinese surface-to-air missile

United Kingdom 
 Vanguard-class ship of the line, a class of warship deployed during the 19th century by the Royal Navy
 Vanguard-class submarine, the Royal Navy's current nuclear ballistic missile submarines
 HMS Vanguard, several British Royal Navy ships

United States 
 Vultee P-66 Vanguard, an American fighter plane built from 1939 to 1943
 Vanguard, nickname of the army 297th Military Intelligence Battalion
 Vanguard, nickname of navy helicopter squadron HM-14
 Vanguards, nickname of the air force 76th Fighter Squadron
 Vanguards, an early nickname of the defunct Navy squadron VX-4

Other countries 
Operation Vanguard, Ghana
 Vanguards, nickname of No. 110 Helicopter Unit, IAF, India
 Vanguard-class multirole warship, a proposed Norwegian class
 Quân Tiên Phong, (Vanguard) nickname of the 308th Infantry Division, Vietnam

Businesses and brands

 Vanguard Airlines, a defunct American airline that operated from 1994 to 2002
 Vanguard Automotive Group, an American car rental company
 Vanguard Cellular, an American cellular phone company that was acquired by AT&T in 1999
 Vanguard Dutch Marine, a Netherlands-based yacht manufacturing company
 Vanguard Health Systems, an American operator of hospitals and other medical facilities
 Vanguard Industries, an American manufacturer of military badges
 Vanguard International Semiconductor Corporation, an IC foundry in Taiwan founded in 1994
 Vanguard Managed Solutions, an American company (2001–2007) of which part is now Vanguard Networks
 Vanguard Sailboats, an American builder of racing and recreational sailboats
 The Vanguard Group, an American investment management company founded in 1975
 China Resources Vanguard, one of the largest supermarket chain companies in Hong Kong
 Vanguard, a 1970s American running shoe made by Brooks Sports
 Vanguard, a former American cigarette made by Brown & Williamson
 Vanguard, a 1960s Eversharp fountain pen made in England
 Vanguard, a line of Swiss watches made by Franck Muller
 Vanguard, a former cigarette made by John Player & Sons
 Vanguard, a line of Swiss watches made by Roamer
 Vanguard, a mid-twentieth century American lighter made by Ronson
 Vanguard, a 1960s Italian-made Waterman fountain pen
 Vanguard, an American line of sporting rifles made by Weatherby
 Vanguard Knife, a hunting knife made by the American company Buck Knives
 Vanguard 888, a mid-twentieth century American radio made by Emerson

Education

Canada 
 Vanguard College, a private Christian college in Edmonton, Alberta
 Vanguard School (Quebec), a private high school in Montreal, Quebec

New Zealand 
 Vanguard Military School, a charter school in Auckland

United States 
 Vanguard College Preparatory School, a private high school in Waco, Texas
 Vanguard High School, a public high school in Ocala, Florida
 Vanguard School (Illinois), a public high school in Arlington Heights, Illinois
 Vanguard University of Southern California, a private Christian university in Costa Mesa, California
 The Vanguard School (Colorado), a public K-12 charter school in Colorado Springs, Colorado
 Vanguard School (Florida), a private boarding high school in Lake Wales, Florida
 The Vanguard School (Pennsylvania), a private school in Malvern, Pennsylvania
 Vanguard School of Coconut Grove, a private day school in Coconut Grove, Florida
 Carnegie Vanguard High School, a public magnet high school in Houston, Texas

Arts, entertainment and media

Film and television 
 Vanguard Animation, an American production studio
 Vanguard Films, a defunct American film production company
 Vanguard Films, a defunct Philippine film production company
 Vanguard (film), a 2020 Chinese action film
 News Vanguard, an Indian TV channel
 Vanguard (TV series), a journalistic reporting series on Current TV

Music 
 Vanguard (synthesizer), a software synthesizer developed by reFX
 Vanguard Records, an independent record label founded in 1950
 The Vanguards, a 1960s Norwegian rock band
 Santa Clara Vanguard Drum and Bugle Corps, A World Class corps and six time DCI world champion based in Santa Clara, California
 Vanguard -of the muses-, an album by Japanese band Exist Trace
 "Vanguard", a single by Violet Chachki from her 2015 EP Gagged

Publications 
 Vanguard (journal), published by the anarchist Vanguard Group
 Vanguard (Nigeria) (Daily Vanguard), a daily newspaper based in Lagos, Nigeria
 Vanguard, a defunct Canadian magazine
 Vanguard Press, a publishing label now owned by Random House
 Portland State Vanguard (formerly Daily Vanguard), the student newspaper at Portland State University
 Vanguard, student newspaper of the University of South Alabama in Mobile, Alabama
 The Vanguard, the student weekly of Bentley University, Waltham, Massachusetts
 The Vanguard (Bentley University), a student newspaper at Bentley University
 The Vanguard (Buckingham Browne & Nichols), a student newspaper at Buckingham Browne & Nichols
 Vanguard, official press organ of hardline, a radical deep ecology movement
 The Vanguard (1922–28), a publication of the émigré Communist Party of India, founded and edited by Manabendra Nath Roy
 The Vanguard (January–March 1853), a short-lived socialist paper published by George Julian Harney

Comics and anime 
 Vanguard (Image Comics), an alien superhero in Megaton and Savage Dragon
 Vanguard (Marvel Comics), a name shared by a mutant Russian character as well as a fictional team of characters 
 Vanguard, a high-tech humanoid robot in the anime Vandread
 Cardfight!! Vanguard an anime series, based on the trading card game

Games and toys 
 Vanguard (video game), a 1981 shooter game, with the 1984 sequel Vanguard II
 Vanguard: Saga of Heroes, a 2007 MMORPG created by Sigil Games Online and Sony Online Entertainment
 Medal of Honor: Vanguard, a first-person shooter game created by Electronic Arts for PlayStation 2 and Wii
 Cardfight!! Vanguard a trading card game
 Vanguard, an organization in the computer game The Longest Journey
 Vanguard, a faction in the video game, Destiny
 Vanguard, the droid partner of the Transformers toy Sideswipe
 Vanguard, a variant of the collectible card game Magic: The Gathering
 Vanguard, the main battle tank used by the New Conglomerate in PlanetSide and PlanetSide 2
 Vanguard, a character class in the video game, Mass Effect, Mass Effect 2, and Mass Effect 3
 Vanguard, a UN-funded military organisation in the City of Heroes universe
 Vanguard, a group of characters in the video game Tales of Symphonia: Dawn of the New World
 Vanguard, a demon (opponent) in the game,Demon's Souls
 Vanguard, a character class in the video game, Chivalry: Medieval Warfare
 Vanguard, the highest rank in Spiral Knights
 Vanguards, a line of die-cast model cars made by Lledo, now owned by British company Corgi
 Call of Duty: Vanguard, a 2021 installment of the Call of Duty franchise

Other arts, entertainment and media 
 Vanguard Radio Network, a Philippine radio network
 Star Trek: Vanguard, a series of novels about a space station called Vanguard
 The Vanguard, a painting which was the basis of the design of Western Cattle in Storm, an American stamp
 The Vanguard (comic), a boys' story paper published in the 1920s by D. C. Thomson & Co.

Organizations 
 Vanguard (organization), a defunct American LGBT rights organization
 Vanguard Public Foundation, a defunct American social justice foundation
 U.P. Vanguard, alumni association of the University of the Philippines ROTC

Politics
 Vanguard, a former name of the Russian Unity party of Ukraine
 Vanguard Group (anarchist), an American anarchist group in the 1930s
 Vanguard Unionist Progressive Party, a unionist political party in Northern Ireland during the 1970s
 Vanguard Organization, a secret unit of the Arab Socialist Union (Egypt) during the presidency of Gamal Abdel Nasser and Anwar Sadat

Sports 
 LGU Vanguards, a defunct Philippine basketball team in the UNTV Cup league
 Vanguard (American racehorse)
 Vanguard (steeplechaser), winner of the 1835 Grand National
 Vanguard Volley Hitters, a Philippine volleyball team of the Spikers' Turf volleyball league

Science and technology 
 Project Vanguard, an American satellite launch project begun in 1957
 Vanguard (rocket), a launch vehicle used in Project Vanguard
 Vanguard TV3, the first satellite launch attempt in 1957
 Vanguard 1, an artificial satellite launched in 1958
 Vanguard 2, an artificial satellite launched in 1959
 Vanguard 3, an artificial satellite launched in 1959
 Vanguard (microkernel), a discontinued experimental microkernel developed at Apple Computer

Transportation

Aviation 
 Vickers Vanguard, a British short/medium-range turboprop airliner (first flown 1959)
 Vickers Type 170 Vanguard, a 1920s British airliner
 Briggs & Stratton Vanguard Big Block V-Twin, a series of piston engines, adapted to propel ultralights

Automobiles 
 Standard Vanguard, a car produced by the British Standard Motor Company from 1947 to 1963
 Toyota Vanguard, a Japanese compact crossover sport utility vehicle

Ships and boats 
 BOKA Vanguard, the largest heavy lift ship ever built
 ST Vanguard, a 250 GRT tugboat formerly the Empire ship named Empire Pine
 USNS Mission San Fernando (T-AO-122), renamed USNS Vanguard in 1965 for role as tracking vessel
 Vanguard 15, one-design racing dinghy made by Vanguard Sailboats

Other uses 
 Vanguard, Saskatchewan, Canada, a village
 Ulmus 'Morton Plainsman', an elm cultivar sold under the trade name Vanguard

See also 
 Daniel Vangarde, French songwriter and producer
 The Vanguard (disambiguation)
 Vanguard Award (disambiguation)
 La Vanguardia ("The Vanguard"), a Spanish newspaper founded in 1881
 La Vanguardia (Argentina) ("The Vanguard"), an Argentinian newspaper founded in 1894